Debi Prasad Sarkar (born 15 January 1958) is an Indian biochemist, immunologist and virologist. He was the head of biochemistry department and dean FIAS, at the University of Delhi South Campus and served as the director of IISER Mohali from 2017 to 2019.  He then resumed his professorship and subsequently promoted to the post of senior professor of biochemistry, with effect from 18 July 2018 at the parent institute, University of Delhi.  Serving as joint director, DSSEED, IoE, University of Delhi. He is renowned for his researches on Sendai virus and developing reconstituted viral envelopes. He is an elected fellow of Indian Academy of Sciences, National Academy of Sciences, India and Indian National Science Academy. The Council of Scientific and Industrial Research, the apex agency of the Government of India for scientific research, awarded him the Shanti Swarup Bhatnagar Prize for Science and Technology, one of the highest Indian Science Awards, in 1998, for his contributions to Biological Sciences. Received Excellence Teacher Award on service by the University of Delhi (99th Foundation Day Celebration of the University of Delhi on 11th September, 2021).

Biography 
Debi Prasad Sarkar, born on 15 January 1958, graduated (Honors) in Chemistry in 1978 and obtained a Master's degree in Biochemistry in 1980 (secured highest marks and awarded BHU Gold Medal), both from Banaras Hindu University. His career started as a senior research fellow at the Biochemistry Department of University of Delhi South Campus in 1985, working on Liposomes as immunomodulators and drug delivery using Liposomes and he secured a PhD degree for his thesis, Immunogenicity of carbohydrate determinants mediated through Liposomes: Liposome-mediated drug delivery from the Calcutta University  in 1986. His post-doctoral studies were at the National Cancer Institute of the National Institutes of Health where he spent two years (1986–88) as visiting fellow and returned to Delhi University to take up the position of a lecturer of Biochemistry (1988). He stayed at the university for the rest of his academic career, holding various positions as the senior lecturer (1993–96) and reader (1996–2002), to superannuate as a senior professor in 2023.

Legacy 
Sarkar's researches on Sendai virus is known to have resulted in the development of reconstituted viral envelopes containing only the fusion protein and this is reported to have assisted in a more efficient gene delivery in therapeutic use. Along with Vijay Kumar, he demonstrated for the first time that HBx protein stimulated Mitogen-activated signaling cascades in living animals. He continued his researches while working as an academic and holds patents for his inventions. Some of the inventions have resulted in Patent Cooperation Treaties (PCT) earning royalties for the university. He has also participated in clinical trials on behalf of the university, including a preclinical study with a Gunn rat model, in collaboration with National Research Development Corporation and AECOM. He has published his research findings in a number of articles and has delivered featured lectures on his work. He has also delivered several award orations including the Prof. B.K. Bachhawat Memorial Lecture of the National Academy of Sciences, India in 2011 and the Platinum Jubilee Lecture at the 102nd edition of the Indian Science Congress in 2015.

Awards and honors 
The Council of Scientific and Industrial Research awarded him the Shanti Swarup Bhatnagar Prize, one of the highest Indian science awards, in 1998. He received the M. Sreenivasaya Memorial Award of the Society of Biological Chemists (India) in 2005 and the J. C. Bose National Fellowship in 2010. The National Academy of Sciences, India elected him as their fellow in 1996 and the Indian Academy of Sciences and the Indian National Science Academy followed suit in 2007 and 2011 respectively. Received "Excellence Award for Teachers in service  in University of Delhi" on 11th September, 2021 in a function to celebrate 99th Foundation Day of University of Delhi from the Chief Guests Shri Amit Khare, Secretary, MoE, GOI and Shri Imtiaz Ali, renowned film director and producer.

Selected bibliography

See also 

 Viral envelope

Notes

References

External links

Further reading 
 

Recipients of the Shanti Swarup Bhatnagar Award in Biological Science
1958 births
Living people
Indian immunologists
Indian biochemists
Indian medical writers
Indian virologists
Fellows of the Indian National Science Academy
Fellows of The National Academy of Sciences, India
Banaras Hindu University alumni
University of Calcutta alumni
National Institutes of Health people
20th-century Indian inventors
20th-century Indian biologists